Pyrus austriaca, the Austrian pear, is a species of flowering plant in the genus Pyrus found in central and southern Europe, and Turkey. They are very large trees for pears, reaching 20m. It is thought to be a hybrid species of Pyrus pyraster (European wild pear) and Pyrus nivalis (snow pear or yellow pear).

References

austriaca
Plants described in 1896